Otocinclus juruenae is a species of armoured catfish endemic to the Juruena river in Mato Grosso, Brazil.

Otocinclus juruenea was discovered in 2016 and is currently only known from the Juruena river for which it is named. It is the first Otocinclus species to be found in the Tapajós river basin. It differs from all other members of the genus Otocinclus (except Otocinclus cocama) in having a complete lateral line. It also differs by having an iris operculum. The adult length of the species ranges from 2.2 to 3.3 cm (0.9 to 1.3 inches).

References

Hypoptopomatini
Freshwater fish of Brazil
Taxa named by Alexandre Cunha Ribeiro
Taxa named by Pablo Cesar Lehmann-Albornoz
Fish described in 2016